Niamiha or Nemiga may refer to:

Niamiha River, Minsk, Belarus
Niamiha Street, Minsk, Belarus
Nemiga (Minsk Metro)